Stefanów may refer to the following places:

Stefanów, Bełchatów County in Łódź Voivodeship (central Poland)
Stefanów, Brzeziny County in Łódź Voivodeship (central Poland)
Stefanów, Chełm County in Lublin Voivodeship (east Poland)
Stefanów, Garwolin County in Masovian Voivodeship (east-central Poland)
Stefanów, Gmina Brójce in Łódź Voivodeship (central Poland)
Stefanów, Gmina Koluszki in Łódź Voivodeship (central Poland)
Stefanów, Gostynin County in Masovian Voivodeship (east-central Poland)
Stefanów, Jarocin County in Greater Poland Voivodeship (west-central Poland)
Stefanów, Kutno County in Łódź Voivodeship (central Poland)
Stefanów, Łęczna County in Lublin Voivodeship (east Poland)
Stefanów, Lower Silesian Voivodeship (south-west Poland)
Stefanów, Opoczno County in Łódź Voivodeship (central Poland)
Stefanów, Radom County in Masovian Voivodeship (east-central Poland)
Stefanów, Silesian Voivodeship (south Poland)
Stefanów, Tomaszów Mazowiecki County in Łódź Voivodeship (central Poland)
Stefanów, Turek County in Greater Poland Voivodeship (west-central Poland)
Stefanów, Zgierz County in Łódź Voivodeship (central Poland)
Stefanów, Zwoleń County in Masovian Voivodeship (east-central Poland)